R3 is a mostly planned expressway passing through central Slovakia in the north–south direction along the European route E77.

It goes from border with Hungary, moving north around Krupina to Zvolen, from there is currently planned to share an 18 km section with R1 and R2 from Budča to Žiar nad Hronom. There is also planned shared section between Žiar nad Hronom and Ráztočno near Handlová with R2. Then continues north, from Martin sharing a section with the D1, then splitting off in either Hubová, going from Dolný Kubín through the Orava River valley to Trstená and ending at border with Poland.The motorway goes along the route I/59,I/18,I/65 and through I/66

From the total length of cca. 230 km (excluding shared sections), these sections are in operation:

 7.2 km Trstená bypass (two-lane)
 5.7 km Oravský Podzámok - Horná Lehota (two-lane)
 1.7 km Martin - Martin, North
 4.3 km Horná Štubňa bypass (two-lane)
What's in construction of the R3 is:
Tvrdošín-Nižná to be completed 2023
The route of the R3 which is designed in three parts, in the north from Trstená to the intersection with the D1 highway in Likavka, in the central part from the intersection with the D1 highway in Martin to the intersection with the expressway along the R2 road in Ráztoč and in the southern part from the intersection with the R1 expressway in Budča to the state border of Slovakia with Hungary near Šahy, where the R3 will connect to the Hungarian highway M2. Even though the connection of the R3 road to the Polish highway network is currently not expected in the north, due to the currently missing highway construction project on the Polish side, this position will probably change in the future. In 2019, the preparation of a technical study was launched in Poland for the continuation of the Polish expressway S7, from the current termination in Rabka-Zdrój to the state border with a prospective connection to the R3 road. The technical study of this road was completed at the end of 2020, Poland envisages the construction of a high-capacity four-lane road. Between Šahy and Dudince, the R3 road will intersect with the R7 road.[2][3]

The total length of the R3, with the exception of toll roads, i.e. sections that the R3 route shares with other highways and expressways, is approximately 200 km. In the case of the route of the southern part of this road, in the section roughly between Zvolen and the state border with Hungary, the technical study also allows the possibility of ending the road R3 in Štúrovo instead of Šahy and at the same time, the technical study also allows the possibility of the route of the road R3 through Hronský Beňadik instead of Budča. The specific route of the R3 road in the southern section has not yet been determined. The southern section of the R3 expressway is at the same time the oldest in terms of plans, as the highway in this corridor is already mentioned in the Resolution of the Government of the Czechoslovak Republic No. 286/1963 from 1963. This resolution envisaged the construction of highway No. 66 in the section from Zvolen directly south to Šahy.

The lengths and routes of individual sections listed below are based on provisional construction plans in 2020, but considering the fact that many sections of the R3 road are only at the beginning, it is almost certain that the lengths and routes of unbuilt sections will still change. In 2020, there was a total change in the routing in the area of Dolný Kubín and in the section from the D1 highway to Dolný Kubín. Road R3 is to be implemented to a considerable extent as a reconstruction or completion of the existing road I/59. The R3 road through the town of Dolný Kubín has been newly extended. The planned intersection of the R3 road with the D1 highway was moved from the Hubová location to the Likavka location.

The international route E77 passes along the route of road R3. R3 will lighten traffic on the Kremnické Bane mountain pass, which is located on I/65. Construction on almost the entire length of R3 will require the relocation of roads, watercourses and engineering networks, as part of environmental protection, sewerage with the separation of oil substances and noise barriers will be built. The construction of two tunnels is tentatively planned for the R3 route; Biela Skala (630m) and Sklené (3450m). Both tunnels are located on the planned Horná Štubňa - Ráztočno section. According to the current plans of the Ministry of Transport, with the exception of the section near Tvrdošín, no sections of the R3 road will be constructed or open until 2028. Sections at a high level of preparation were not included in the plans either. With regard to the current intentions of the Ministry of Transport, the operation of the expressway along the entire length of the route cannot be expected before the year 2050.[4][5][6]

Junctions of the R3

Future of construction

Part Tvrdošín - Nižná nad Oravou, first half, under construction

Trstená bypass 
The Trstená bypass on the R3 was under construction since April 2008 and after 30 months it was completed on 29 October 2010 the section is completely paved and handed over in half profile. The construction was financed from the state budget and was implemented by the companies VÁHOSTAV – SK, a. with. and Inžinierske stavby, a. with. . The length of the section is 7.2 km. There are 14 bridges and 3 intersections on the section, including two level crossings at both ends as a temporary connection to the roadI/59.

Tvrdošín – Nižná 
Tvrdošín – Nižná is a section of R3 under construction. Due to the lack of funding for the construction of this section in 2018, its construction did not start until 3 years later. Its length is 4.4 km. It is being built for €62 million. The route runs on the left bank of the Oravy. There will be 14 bridge objects, 2 extra-level intersections and a large left-side rest area Tvrdošín. The contract for construction in a half profile was signed 25 February 2021 with a completion date of 2023.

Nižná – Dlhá nad Oravou 
The planned section will extend R3 to the village of Dlhá nad Oravou by a length of 8.6 km. Construction was to begin in 2019 and completion was planned for 2022. The state will finance the section with a budget of €94,602,668.80 (SKK 2,850,000,000) according to plans from 2006. The route runs parallel to II/584. The Podbiel tunnel, 515 meters long, 19 bridges, and a level crossing is planned here.

Dlhá nad Oravou – Sedliacka Dubová 
The section Dlhá nad Oravou – Sedliacka Dubová will extend the R3 by 4.2 km. The construction was planned for the years 2015–2017, while according to the plans from 2006, the construction should cost €48,131,182.37 (SKK 1,450,000,000). The section includes the Dlha nad Oravou and Sedliacká Dubová bypasses, 11 bridges, and a level crossing. The route will be built on varied geological ground.

Horna lehota - oravsky podzamok[edit]
Section R3 between Horná Lehota and Oravský Podzámok is a section of R3 in use since 2007, although only in half profile. The length of the section is 6.442 km, its construction took place in the years 2004 - 2007 by the companies Váhostav - SK, a.s., Max Bogl and Skanska, a.s., the construction was financed by the state budget. The section replaced I/59, which increased the flow and safety of traffic. According to STN 736100, category R11.5/100 was used for the section, as a result of which the maximum permitted speed is limited to 100 km/h. There are 9 bridges on the route, one of which is dominant over the Orava River and the railway, 750 meters long, 2 intersections (at the beginning and at the end).

Oravský Podzámok – Dolný Kubín north 
Section R3, which will connect to Dolný Kubín to the expressway network, was to be built in the years 2016 - 2018, early use was planned for 2017. Its total length is 3,226 km. According to plans from 2007, the construction should cost the state budget €27,822,644.9 (SKK 838,185,000). The section will include 3 bridges, the "Dolný Kubín-sever" interchange.

Dolný Kubín-north – R3 D1 junction 
The section Dolný Kubín - intersection D1 is a section connecting the town of Dolný Kubín with the D1 highway. Alternatives for connecting to the highway with connection to MÚK Hubová and MÚK Likavka are currently being assessed. The original variant for Kraľovany was rejected from an environmental point of view. Its length will be 17.8 km. The section is situated at the interface of Oravy and Liptova. The section will have 3 level crossings and 2 tunnels near Dolný Kubín with a length of 1569 m and 3004 m.

Horna Štubna bypass 
The construction of the 4.321 km long Horne Štubna section began in December 2008. The construction was financed from the state budget and was made by the companies Strabag, a.s. and Skanska, a.s. Ochvat is located near the junction of the mountain passes Kremnické Bane and Šturec. The route is located in the corridor Zvolen – Diviaky railway line. There are 6 bridges and two level crossings at the end and beginning of the route. The building was ceremonially handed over for use on 23 November 2010 .

Zvolen - Šahy 
The process of assessing the effects of the proposed activity "Expressway R3 Zvolen – Šahy" on the environment was stopped. According to the NDS statement, the preparation of the 6.5 km long Krupina bypass and the 4.8 km long Šahy bypass will continue, for which the NDS will have financial coverage.

See also 

 Highways in Slovakia
 Transport in Slovakia
 Controlled-access highway
 Limited-access road

Resources 

 https://ww-w.ndsas.sk/narodna-dialnicna-spolocnost
 https://eznamka.sk/sk/
 https://www.emyto.sk/sk

References[edit] 

 ^ Jump up to:a b c http://dialnice.szm.com/highways/opening.html List of motorways and expressways constructions in use.
 ^ Template:Citácia elektronického dokumentu
 ^ Template:Citácia elektronického dokumentu
 ^ Template:Citácia elektronického dokumentu
 ^ Template:Citácia elektronického dokumentu
 ^ Template:Citácia elektronického dokumentu
 ^ Template:Citácia elektronického dokumentu
 ^ Template:Citácia elektronického dokumentu
 ^ Template:Citácia elektronického dokumentu
 ^ Template:Citácia elektronického dokumentu
 ^ Template:Citácia elektronického dokumentu
 ^ 
 ^ 
 ^ 
 ^ 
 ^ 
 ^ 
 ^

References

External links
 Highways portal by INEKO Institute (slovak)
 R3 exit list

Highways in Slovakia